The Bering Strait is the strait that connects the Arctic Ocean and the Bering Sea.

Bering Strait or Bering Straits may also refer to:

 Bering Strait (band), a Russian country-and-western band
 Bering Strait (album), the band's debut album, released in 2003
 Bering Strait crossing or Bering Strait bridge, a proposal for a bridge and/or tunnel crossing of the strait
 Bering Strait School District, a public school district serving most of the Nome Census Area, Alaska, United States
 Bering Straits Native Corporation, a company created by the provisions of the Alaska Native Claims Settlement Act, also serving the Nome Census Area
 Beringia or the "Bering strait land bridge", an ice-age-era land bridge connecting present-day Asia and North America
 , a United States Navy seaplane tender in commission from 1944 to 1946
 , later WHEC-382, a United States Coast Guard cutter in commission from 1948 to 1971

See also
 Bering (disambiguation)